Sangano is a comune (municipality) in the Metropolitan City of Turin in the Italian region Piedmont, located about  west of Turin.

Sangano borders the following municipalities: Reano, Villarbasse, Trana, Rivalta di Torino, Bruino  and Piossasco.

Twin towns
 Diamantina, Brazil

References

Related articles 
 Monte Pietraborga

External links
 Official website

Cities and towns in Piedmont